The Chapel of Nossa Senhora de Baluarte is located on the most eastern tip of the Island of Mozambique within Stone Town.  The island sits off the coast of Mozambique in Africa. The Chapel is situated outside the Fort São Sebastião from which it can be reached through a gate.

Built by the Portuguese in 1522, the chapel is considered to be the oldest European building in the southern hemisphere.  It is also considered to be one of the finest examples of Manueline vaulted architecture in Mozambique.

Gallery

Notes

Roman Catholic churches completed in 1522
Roman Catholic churches in Mozambique
Buildings and structures in Nampula Province
Tourist attractions in Nampula Province
1522 establishments in the Portuguese Empire
Portuguese colonial architecture in Mozambique
16th-century Roman Catholic church buildings